Badoit is a brand of carbonated mineral water from Saint-Galmier, France.

History

Badoit is named after Auguste Badoit, who began bottling the water of Saint Galmier in 1838. In 1971, Badoit became part of Evian SA, which later became a fully owned subsidiary of Boussois Souchon Neuvesel. Today, Badoit is a product and brand of the Danone group.

In June 2019, Danone announced that from that month onward, Badoit would no longer be available in the UK. Danone explained that, as Badoit is a natural mineral water, the company was conscious of the need to preserve the source and never collect more than nature can offer. The Saint Galmier region of France had been experiencing droughts over the past few years and this had affected the rate of groundwater replenishment. Danone believed that the responsible approach was to reduce the amount of Badoit it bottled and sold, to protect the source for future generations.

Description
"The carbonic acid gas therein is formed by combination and not by compression. This is a very clear water, a tangy flavor, fresh, very nice. In its most recent analysis made by Mr. O. Henry, giving it nearly 3 grams of carbon dioxide per liter, many earthen and alkaline bi-carbonates and proportion of nitrate of magnesia whose presence seems to explain this amazing fact that the residents of Saint-Galmier have never counted a calculous person among them." One source in 1856 says that the spring was capable of producing 7000 bottles a day.

A 2004 analysis by the French Society for Radiation Protection confirms the spring water emits 70 becquerels per liter of radiation before treatment, containing 58 mg/m3 of uranium, 350 Bq/m3 of radium-226 and 713 Bq/m3 of radium-228. After treatment, it contains 5.45 mg/m3 of uranium, 28 Bq/m3 of radium 226 and 44 Bq/m3 of radium 228.

References

External links

Bottled water brands
Groupe Danone brands
French brands
1971 mergers and acquisitions